Côme Zoumara (born 1959?) is a political figure in the Central African Republic who was Foreign Minister from September 2006 to January 2008.

Under Presidents André Kolingba and Ange-Félix Patassé, Zoumara was an official at the Ministry of the Economy. He also worked as a consultant. In July 2003, he became advisor to President François Bozizé on defense, disarmament, and reintegration. He was appointed as the Minister of Foreign Affairs, Regional Integration, and La Francophonie on 2 September 2006, replacing Jean-Paul Ngoupandé. Zoumara served in that position until January 2008, when he was replaced in the government of Prime Minister Faustin-Archange Touadéra.

He is part of the National Convergence-Kwa na Kwa.

References

External links 

1959 births
Living people
National Convergence "Kwa Na Kwa" politicians
Government ministers of the Central African Republic
Foreign ministers of the Central African Republic